The 2016 Monterrey Challenger was a professional tennis tournament played on hard courts. It was the seventh edition of the tournament which was part of the 2016 ATP Challenger Tour. It took place in Monterrey, Mexico from 10 to 15 of October 2016.

Singles main-draw entrants

Seeds

 1 Rankings are as of October 3, 2016.

Other entrants
The following players received wildcards into the singles main draw:
  Marco Trungelliti
  Lucas Gómez
  Mauricio Astorga
  Daniel Garza

The following players entered the main draw as alternates:
  Nicolaas Scholtz
  Kaichi Uchida

The following players received entry from the qualifying draw:
  Juan Lizariturry
  Tucker Vorster
  Ruben Gonzales
  Gonzalo Escobar

Champions

Singles

  Ernesto Escobedo def.  Denis Kudla, 6–4, 6–4.

Doubles

  Evan King /  Denis Kudla def.  Jarryd Chaplin /  Ben McLachlan, 7–5 6–2.

External links
Official Website

2016 in Mexican tennis
Monterrey Challenger